Saqalaksar (also Romanized as Saqālaksār) is a village in Lakan Rural District, in the Central District of Rasht County, Gilan Province, Iran. At the 2006 census, its population was 584, in 168 families.

References 
3. Seghaleksar Rasht (in Persian) 

Populated places in Rasht County
Lakes of Iran